Olenecamptus macari is a species of beetle in the family Cerambycidae. It was described by Lameere in 1892.

References

Dorcaschematini
Beetles described in 1892